For other localities with the same name, see Tsaratanana (disambiguation)

Tsaratanana is a town and commune in Madagascar. It belongs to the district of Ifanadiana, which is a part of the region of Vatovavy. The population of the commune was  23,252 in 2018.

Primary and junior level secondary education are available in town. The majority 93% of the population of the commune are farmers.  The most important crops are rice and beans, while other important agricultural products are coffee and cassava. Services provide employment for 7% of the population.

References

Populated places in Vatovavy